The 2003 UCF Golden Knights football team represented the University of Central Florida in the 2003 NCAA Division I-A football season. After signing a three-year contract extension to begin the season, head coach Mike Kruczek was fired following a 3–7 start. Kruczek was replaced on an interim basis by Assistant coach and former player Alan Gooch who finished out the dismal 3-9 season.

With three games remaining, senior starting quarterback Ryan Schnieder was suspended from the team, effectively ending his college career.

2003 marked the Golden Knights second season in the Mid-American Conference, in the East Division.

Schedule

References

UCF
UCF Knights football seasons
UCF Golden Knights football